Greger is a surname. Notable people with the surname include:

Christoph Greger (born 1997), German footballer
Jonas Greger Walnum (1771–1838),  Norwegian property owner and politician
Debora Greger (born 1949), American poet and artist
Luise Greger (1862–1944), German composer and pianist
Max Greger (1926–2015), German Jazz musician, saxophonist, big band director and conductor
Michael Greger (born 1972), American physician, author, and speaker on public health issues
Piotr Greger
Rolf Greger Strøm (1940–1994) Norwegian luger

See also

Greger (given name)
Gregers, another given name

Surnames from given names